Hemigomphus atratus is a species of dragonfly of the family Gomphidae, 
known as the black vicetail. 
It is endemic to north-eastern Queensland, Australia, where it inhabits rainforest streams.

Hemigomphus atratus is a small, black and yellow dragonfly. 
Very little other information is known of this species, all of it coming from a single specimen found living at a freshwater stream near Tinaroo Dam, in north-eastern Queensland.

Etymology
The species name atratus is a Latin word meaning clothed in black. Tony Watson named this species of dragonfly after its blackish brown abdomen.

Gallery

See also
 List of Odonata species of Australia

References

Gomphidae
Odonata of Australia
Insects of Australia
Endemic fauna of Australia
Taxa named by J.A.L. (Tony) Watson
Insects described in 1991
Taxonomy articles created by Polbot